Sheila Firestone Ford Hamp (born October 31, 1951) is an American businesswoman and  football executive.  A descendant of both the Ford and Firestone family fortunes, she is the principal owner and chairwoman of the Detroit Lions of the National Football League (NFL). Hamp graduated from Yale University in 1973, where she played varsity tennis, and has an MA in teaching and early childhood education from Boston University. She serves on the NFL's Super Bowl and Major Events Committee. 

Hamp had served as vice chairwoman of the Lions since 2014, and succeeded her mother Martha Firestone Ford on June 23, 2020.

Early life and education
Sheila Ford was born to parents William Clay Ford Sr., son of Edsel Ford and grandson of Henry Ford, and Martha Firestone Ford, of the Firestone Tire and Rubber Company fortune, in 1951. She earned a bachelor's degree from Yale in 1973, where she was among the first class that included women. She received a master's degree in teaching and early childhood education from Boston University. Ford competed in tennis while at Yale and won a Michigan state championship in high school.

Professional sports

Detroit Lions
Ford Hamp has been involved in the management of the Detroit Lions since her mother took over the team in 2014. In 2015, Ford Hamp was involved in the decision to fire Tom Lewand and Martin Mayhew.  In 2019, she was involved in the retention of general manager Bob Quinn and head coach Matt Patricia. On June 23, 2020, Ford Hamp took over from her mother as principal owner and chairwoman. Her first major move after taking over as principal owner of the Lions was to fire Quinn and Patricia on November 28, 2020 after a 4–7 start to the 2020 season.

Personal life
Ford Hamp is married to Steve Hamp and lives with her husband and three children in Ann Arbor.

References

1951 births
Living people
Yale Bulldogs women's tennis players
Boston University alumni
Detroit Lions owners
Firestone family
Henry Ford family
Women sports owners